Michael Vincent Nittoli (born November 11, 1990) is an American professional baseball pitcher in the Chicago Cubs organization. He has previously played in Major League Baseball (MLB) for the Seattle Mariners and Philadelphia Phillies. He was drafted by the Mariners in the 25th round of the 2014 Major League Baseball draft.

Career

Seattle Mariners
Nittoli was drafted by the Seattle Mariners in the 25th round, 741st overall, of the 2014 Major League Baseball draft out of Xavier College. He made his professional debut with the Low-A Everett AquaSox, pitching to a 4.03 ERA in 12 appearances. The next year, Nittoli played for the AZL Mariners, posting a 3.60 ERA with 7 strikeouts in 10.0 innings pitched. He split the 2016 season between the Single-A Clinton LumberKings and the High-A Bakersfield Blaze, accumulating a 5-5 record and 3.88 ERA in 40 appearances between the two teams. On April 14, 2017, Nittoli was released by the Mariners organization.

St. Paul Saints
After his release from the Mariners organization, Nittoli's father's friend referred him to former teammate George Tsamis, who was the manager of the St. Paul Saints of the American Association of Independent Professional Baseball at the time. After a phone call with Tsamis, Nittoli signed with the Saints. In 34 games out of the bullpen in 2017, Nittoli recorded a 2-3 record and 3.33 ERA with 55 strikeouts in 46.0 innings of work. In 2018, Nittoli converted to a starter, and pitched to a 3-2 record and 3.21 ERA in 5 starts for the Saints, striking out 38 in 28.0 innings.

Arizona Diamondbacks
On December 13, 2018, Nittoli signed a minor league contract with the Arizona Diamondbacks organization that included an invitation to Spring Training. He did not make the club and was assigned to the Triple-A Reno Aces to begin the 2019 season. Nittoli struggled to an 0-4 record and 9.50 ERA in 5 games before being released on May 11, 2019.

Toronto Blue Jays
On May 18, 2019, Nittoli signed a minor league contract with the Toronto Blue Jays organization. He finished the year with the Double-A New Hampshire Fisher Cats, logging a 3-2 record and 3.80 ERA in 29 games. Nittoli did not play in a game in 2020 due to the cancellation of the minor league season because of the COVID-19 pandemic. On November 2, 2020, he elected free agency.

Seattle Mariners (second stint)
On November 6, 2020, Nittoli signed a minor league contract with the Seattle Mariners organization. He was invited to Spring Training, but did not make the club and was assigned to the Triple-A Tacoma Rainiers to begin the season. After posting a 3.50 ERA in 11 games with Tacoma, on June 18, 2021, Nittoli was selected to the 40-man roster and promoted to the major leagues for the first time. He made his MLB debut on June 23, pitching one inning of one-run ball against the Colorado Rockies. In the game, he notched his first MLB strikeout, punching out Rockies infielder Chris Owings.
On July 27, Nittoli was designated for assignment by the Mariners. On July 30, Nittoli was outrighted back to Triple-A Tacoma. On August 27, Nittoli was released by the Mariners.

Minnesota Twins
On August 28, 2021, Nittoli signed a minor league contract with the Minnesota Twins. He was assigned to the Triple-A St. Paul Saints. He elected free agency on November 7, 2021.

New York Yankees
On November 8, 2021, Nittoli signed a minor league contract with the New York Yankees organization. He opted out of his contract and became a free agent on July 16, 2022.

Toronto Blue Jays (second stint)
On July 21, 2022, Nittoli signed a minor league contract with the Toronto Blue Jays organization.

Philadelphia Phillies
On August 30, 2022, Nittoli was traded to the Philadelphia Phillies.

On January 4, 2023, Nittoli was designated for assignment following the team’s acquisition of Erich Uelmen.  On January 9, Nittoli was released.

Chicago Cubs
On January 12, 2023, Nittoli signed a minor league contract with the Chicago Cubs organization.

References

External links

1990 births
Living people
Sportspeople from Tempe, Arizona
Baseball players from Arizona
Major League Baseball pitchers
Seattle Mariners players
Philadelphia Phillies players
Xavier Musketeers baseball players
Everett AquaSox players
Arizona League Mariners players
Bakersfield Blaze players
Clinton LumberKings players
St. Paul Saints players
Águilas de Mexicali players
American expatriate baseball players in Mexico
Reno Aces players
New Hampshire Fisher Cats players
Tacoma Rainiers players
Buffalo Bisons (minor league) players
Scranton/Wilkes-Barre RailRiders players
2023 World Baseball Classic players